Erminio Antonio Suárez Gauna (born 27 June 1969) is a retired male track cyclist from Argentina. He claimed the gold medal in the Men's Points Race at the 1991 Pan American Games in Havana, Cuba, defeating Jairo Giraldo (Colombia) and Conrado Cabrera (Cuba). Suárez represented his native country at the 1992 Summer Olympics, finishing in tenth place in the same event.

References

1969 births
Living people
Argentine male cyclists
Argentine track cyclists
Cyclists at the 1992 Summer Olympics
Olympic cyclists of Argentina
Cyclists at the 1991 Pan American Games
Place of birth missing (living people)
Pan American Games gold medalists for Argentina
Pan American Games medalists in cycling
Medalists at the 1991 Pan American Games
20th-century Argentine people
21st-century Argentine people